Series 1 of The Great Irish Bake Off aired on TV3 in Ireland and saw twelve home bakers take part in a bake-off to test every aspect of their baking skills as they battled to be crowned The Great Irish Bake Off's best amateur baker. Each week saw keen bakers put through two challenges in a particular discipline. The series aired from 19 September 2013 till 7 November 2013, and saw Stephen Chisholm win.

The Bakers

Results summary

Colour key:

Episodes

Episode 1: Cakes

Episode 2: Tarts

Episode 3: Bread

Episode 4: Desserts

Episode 5: Chocolate

Episode 6: Patisserie

Episode 7: Semi Final

Episode 8: Final

References

2013 Irish television seasons
1